Save Us From Our House! is a Canadian reality series, which premiered on W Network in Canada in 2005. The series was produced by General Purpose Pictures.

The program focused on families who were suffering interpersonal tensions due to their living spaces. A licensed psychotherapist (Hina Khan) counseled the family through their relationship difficulties, while a construction contractor (Scott Puddicombe in the first season, Dylan Marcel for the remainder of the series) remodeled the home into a more welcoming and family-oriented living space.

The series also aired on HGTV in the United States.

The program's theme song was an instrumental portion of Spirit of the West's 1990 single "Save This House".

References

External links 
 

Home renovation television series
2005 Canadian television series debuts
2010 Canadian television series endings
2000s Canadian reality television series
2010s Canadian reality television series
Canadian dating and relationship reality television series
W Network original programming